Biturix venosata is a moth of the family Erebidae. It was described by Francis Walker in 1865. It is found in Mexico, Panama, Costa Rica and southern Texas.

References

Phaegopterina
Moths described in 1865